The 2022–23 season is Levski Sofia's 102nd season in the First League. This article shows player statistics and all matches (official and friendly) that the club will play during the season.

Transfers

In

Out

Loans out

Squad

Updated on 6 March 2023.

Performance overview

Fixtures

Friendlies

Summer

Mid-season

Winter

First League

Preliminary stage

League table

Results summary

Results by round

Matches
The league fixtures were announced on 15 June 2022.

Bulgarian Cup

Bulgarian Supercup

UEFA Europa Conference League

Second qualifying round

Third qualifying round

Squad statistics

Appearances and goals

|-
|colspan="14"|Players from the reserve team:

|-
|colspan="14"|Players away from the club on loan:

|-
|colspan="14"|Players who left the club during the season:

|}

Clean sheets

Disciplinary record
Includes all competitive matches.

References
General
 Official club website

Specific

Notes

PFC Levski Sofia seasons
Levski Sofia